Tower Theater, Upper Darby 1975 is a live album by Bruce Springsteen & The E Street Band, released in February 2015 and was the third official release through the Bruce Springsteen Archives. The show was originally recorded at the Tower Theater in Upper Darby, Pennsylvania on December 31, 1975.

The concert is available on CD and digital download.

Background
The last night of 1975 was also the last night of the Born to Run tour proper. Engineer Jimmy Iovine brought The Record Plant Remote truck out for the occasion. Front of House recordings of this show have circulated for years, along with partial tapes of stereo mixes from the multitracks. This marks the first time the entire show has been mixed for release.

Track listing
All tracks by Bruce Springsteen, except where noted.

Set one
"Intro" – 1:14
"Night" – 3:25
"Tenth Avenue Freeze-Out" – 4:12
"Spirit in the Night" – 7:12
"Does This Bus Stop at 82nd Street?" – 5:09
"It's My Life" – 8:04 
Originally recorded by The Animals
"She's the One" – 6:37
"Born to Run" – 4:38
"Pretty Flamingo" – 12:36 
Originally recorded by Manfred Mann 
"It's Hard to Be a Saint in the City" – 6:13
"Backsteets" – 8:53
"Mountain of Love" – 3:36 
Originally recorded by Harold Dorman 
"Jungleland" – 12:32
"Rosalita (Come Out Tonight)" – 14:52

Encore
"4th of July, Asbury Park (Sandy)" – 7:29
"Detroit Medley" – 13:48
"Devil With a Blue Dress On"  Originally recorded by Mitch Ryder and The Detroit Wheels
"See See Rider"  Originally recorded by Ma Rainey 
"Good Golly Miss Molly"  Originally recorded by Little Richard 
"Jenny Take a Ride"  Originally recorded by Mitch Ryder and The Detroit Wheels
"Quarter to Three" – 10:46 
"Thunder Road" – 6:45
"Twist and Shout" – 7:55 
Most famously recorded by The Isley Brothers and The Beatles

Personnel
 Bruce Springsteen – lead vocals, guitars, harmonica
 Roy Bittan – piano
 Clarence Clemons – saxophone, percussion, background vocals
 Danny Federici – organ, electronic glockenspiel, accordion
 Garry Tallent – bass guitar
 Steven Van Zandt – guitars, background vocals 
 Max Weinberg – drums
Jimmy Iovine – recording engineer
Dave Hewitt – assistant engineer
Toby Scott – mastering engineer

References

2015 live albums
Bruce Springsteen Archives